CDK2 associated cullin domain 1 is a protein that in humans is encoded by the CACUL1 gene.

References

Further reading